Esparragalejo is a municipality of Spain in the province of Badajoz, autonomous region of Extremadura.

Located about 8 miles from Mérida, it is known for its unique Roman multiple arch buttress dam, the Esparragalejo Dam, its two natural lagoons, and its religious festivals. During the festivities to honor the town's patron saint, the Virgin of Good Health (Virgen de la Salud), its inhabitants come to the cathedral to witness the one-hour Mass and then occupy the streets completely. The townspeople take to the streets to put on a procession, to play music, and to put on shows for the town's children.

Origin of name
The name Esparragalejo refers to the communal pastureland known as the Esparragal. A diminutive suffix was added to the town name because the town remained small for many centuries.

References

Municipalities in the Province of Badajoz